Gunnared is the northern part of Angered, in Gothenburg, Sweden. It was formerly one administrative division, but was split into two parts, Gunnared in the north and Lärjedalen in the south.

Boroughs of Gothenburg